"Mirror, Mirror" is a song written by Bob DiPiero, John Jarrard and Mark D. Sanders and recorded by American country music group Diamond Rio.  It was released in July 1991 as the second single from their self-titled album.  It peaked at number 3 in the United States, and number 4 in Canada.

Music video
The music video was directed by Michael Merriman, and features the band playing in a room full of mirrors so as to somewhat match the song's concept.

Chart performance

Year-end charts

References

1991 singles
Diamond Rio songs
Songs written by Bob DiPiero
Songs written by John Jarrard
Songs written by Mark D. Sanders
Arista Nashville singles
1991 songs